Makindye is a hill in Kampala, Uganda's largest city and capital. The name also refers to the neighborhood that sits on that hill. Makindye is also the seat of Makindye Division, one of the five administrative zones of the city of Kampala.

Location
Makindye is bordered by Nsambya to the north, Kibuye to the northwest, Najjanankumbi to the west, Lubowa in Wakiso District to the south, Luwafu to the southeast, and Lukuli to the east. Kansanga and Kabalagala lie to Makindye's northeast. The coordinates of Makindye are 0°16'45.0"N, 32°35'10.0"E (Latitude:0.279175; Longitude:32.586120).

Overview
It affords a view of the surrounding areas of the city and of neighboring parts of Wakiso District. It also affords a view of Murchison Bay, a part of Lake Victoria to the east and southeast of Makindye. The residential areas on Makindye hill are of middle class proportions. Many of the homes have adjacent plots of land that are often used to grow vegetables.

Points of interest
The following points of interest lie on or near Makindye Hill:
 Headquarters of Makindye Division
 Makindye military police barracks
 Makindye Foursquare Gospel Church - A place of worship affiliated with the Pentecostal Movement
 Kiruddu General Hospital - A public hospital administered by the Uganda Ministry of Health - In development.

Photos
 Photo of Gas Station in Makindye

See also
 Kampala Capital City Authority
 Nsambya
 Makindye Prison

References

External links
Police Arrest Somali From Makindye Guesthouse

Neighborhoods of Kampala
Cities in the Great Rift Valley
Makindye Division